The 1915 Lafayette football team was an American football team that represented Lafayette College as an independent during the 1915 college football season. In its second season under head coach Wilmer G. Crowell, the team compiled an 8–3 record. John Luhr was the team captain.  The team played its home games at March Field in Easton, Pennsylvania.

Schedule

References

Lafayette
Lafayette Leopards football seasons
Lafayette football